Sithukkadu is a village in Thanjavur district, Tamil Nadu, India.

Villages in Thanjavur district